The 1995–96 Hong Kong First Division League season was the 85th since its establishment.

First stage

Second stage

Grand final

References
– List of final tables (RSSSF)
  Hong Kong Soccer – Gibson Lam's Homepage

Hong Kong First Division League seasons
Hong Kong First Division League, 1995–96
First Division